Frederick Layton (May 18, 1827 – August 16, 1919) was an English-American businessman, philanthropist and art collector. He immigrated to Milwaukee, Wisconsin Territory, with his father in 1843, when the city was still a pioneer village. He played a major role in the creation of Milwaukee's meat packing industry and established a trans-Atlantic business exporting his meat products to Great Britain. During his lifetime, he made 99 trips across the Atlantic pursuing business interests and collecting fine art in London and the other capitals of Europe. Throughout his life, he consistently donated his money to support local charities and Milwaukee's art community. In 1888, he built the Layton Art Gallery on the corner of Mason and Jefferson streets in Milwaukee, one of the nation's earliest single-patron public art galleries. By creating an endowment for the gallery, and with donations from the gallery trustees and friends, Layton was personally able to purchase over 200 works of art for the gallery before dying at the age of 92. Though the original building of the Layton Art Gallery no longer exists, many of Mr. Layton's purchases comprise the founding, core collection of early European and American art at the Milwaukee Art Museum. The Layton Art Collection Board of Trustees still supports and maintains the historic collection in collaboration with Milwaukee Art Museum staff and volunteers.

Early life 

Layton was born in Little Wilbraham, a village in Cambridgeshire, England, the only son of Mary and John Layton. The family moved to Great Wilbraham in 1836, where Frederick's father established a small country butcher shop and taught his son the trade.

In 1842, father and son immigrated to the United States. They spent the winter in Buffalo, New York, before arriving in Wisconsin in 1843. Mary Layton rejoined the family and immigrated to Milwaukee in 1847.

Business 
Father and son established their first home in Wisconsin as farmers in the town of Raymond in Racine County, Wisconsin. After two years, they returned to the butcher trade and opened the J&F Layton Meat Market in Milwaukee on East Water Street in 1845.

In 1849, John and Frederick purchased farmland near what is now Forest Home Cemetery and built a three-story brick building, constructed for the purpose of a home as well as a hotel for paying guests traveling the Janesville–Milwaukee Plank Road. The Layton Hotel was a popular choice for farmers transporting wheat: "the roads were in such frightful condition that farmers and other travelers welcomed the opportunity to stay overnight, waiting for daylight to continue their journey."

In 1852, Frederick joined John Plankinton to form a partnership for the packing of pork and beef under the name of Layton & Plankinton. With a loan of $3,000 (equivalent to $ in ) from Samuel Marshall and Charles Ilsley of Marshall and Ilsley Bank, the two built a slaughter and packinghouse in the Menominee Valley of Milwaukee.

As business grew, Layton began traveling abroad and created a network of provision wholesalers in Liverpool and London. With the aid of wholesalers Samuel Page and John Hargreaves, Layton products became widely known in England.

Though the Layton & Plankinton business was successful, the two parted ways to form their own firms. In 1861, Frederick and John Layton established their packing plant in the Menominee Valley under the style of Layton & Co.

In 1865, Frederick Layton, Samuel Marshall, Charles F. Ilsley, John Plankinton, and W. S. Johnson incorporated the Milwaukee Railway Company, absorbing the River and Lake Shore City Railway Company. With the increasing advancements of the railroad industry, Layton & Co. found new and improved ways to efficiently receive and deliver both their livestock and meat products.

John Layton remained head of the plant until his death in 1875, whereupon Frederick took over until his retirement in 1900 at the age of 73. The company continued long after Layton's retirement, until 1935, when it liquidated its assets.

In 1999, Frederick Layton was inducted to the Wisconsin Meat Industry Hall of Fame.

There are two Milwaukee streets named after Frederick Layton. Layton Avenue was designated by Patrick Cudahy in 1892 when he named the streets of the city of Cudahy. Layton Boulevard, which runs through the Menomonee Valley where the Layton & Co. packing plant once stood, was named through an ordinance adopted by the city of Milwaukee in 1909.

Private life 
In 1851, Layton married Elizabeth Ann Hayman.   The daughter of Joel and Mary Hayman, Elizabeth and her family immigrated to Oak Creek, Wisconsin, from Devonshire, England, in 1836. The wedding was officiated by the Reverend Doctor David Keene of St. John's Episcopal Church. Keene was also an English immigrant who collected engravings, etchings and fine rare books. With a common background and interest in art, Keene and the Laytons became lifelong friends.

In 1865, Frederick and Elizabeth settled in a clapboard house located at 524 Marshall Street, Milwaukee. Although Layton's business was successful and while his contemporaries were moving into larger, more luxurious residences, Layton and his wife maintained their home to the end of their days. It was recorded that inside the house were plain, old-fashioned furniture and homemade rag rugs laid on painted wood floors. Frances Stover wrote: "Mr. Layton enjoyed visiting the fine homes of his friends; he praised their taste, he admired architectural niceties. But for himself, the small square house was sufficient." Frederick and Elizabeth had no children. Elizabeth died on June 3, 1910.

Layton and his wife kept their life private as much as possible. When one reporter kept prying, Layton responded: "I have done nothing to cause people to want to know of my private life. Mrs. Layton and I have given when we could in a way that we hoped would be a source of occasional pleasure or benefit to others, but we have had our return in the pleasure of giving and there's no need of talking of it."

Art 

In 1883, Layton and Alexander Mitchell were given a farewell dinner at the Milwaukee Club on a Monday evening to celebrate their upcoming departure to Europe. After a toast to their safe journey, Layton commented that something must be done to build an art gallery for the city of Milwaukee. Word spread quickly and Layton was called on the next day by a newspaper reporter, enquiring how soon he planned to build an art gallery. Layton told him "to say but little about it since the whole matter was yet but an intention."   Instead, the Milwaukee Sentinel reported that Layton "was now going abroad and intends studying the architecture and management of art institutes while there and hoped to pick up some information that would be of value in the construction of a model building here." By Sunday, The New York Times reported that Layton "stated definitely that on his return from Europe he will give the city a fine art building."

Committed to the project, Layton set out on his voyage across the Atlantic and hired George Ashdown Audsley, a Liverpool architect to design the gallery building. A local Milwaukee firm led by Edward Townsend Mix worked jointly with the British architect to carry out the construction. The resulting design was a single-story top-lit gallery that differed from other American gallery designs of the period. Authors John C. Eastberg and Eric Vogel observe in their book, Layton's Legacy, that the gallery design was directly inspired by the art galleries of Great Britain and compare the Layton Art Gallery's floor plan, façade and elevations with institutions such as the Walker Art Gallery in Liverpool, the Dulwich Picture Gallery of Greater London and the Fitzwilliam Museum in Cambridge.

In collecting works of art for the gallery, Layton sought artworks from a range of popular artists of his time. Artworks by European artists such as William-Adolphe Bouguereau, James Tissot, Jan van Os, August Johann Holmberg and American artists Eastman Johnson, Winslow Homer, John Frederick Kensett, Frederick Edwin Church and George Inness were all purchased by Frederick Layton and hung in the gallery.   Gifts from local and international donors such as Judson Roundy, Frederick Pabst, Philip Danforth Armour, Samuel Marshall, Charles Ilsley, Daniel Wells, Edward Phelps Allis, Charles T. Bradley, Patrick and John Cudahy, John L. Mitchell, Samuel Page, John Hargreaves and Arthur Tooth brought artworks and sculpture by Jules Bastien-Lepage, Lawrence Alma-Tadema, Frederic Leighton, Albert Bierstadt, William A. Breakspeare, Benjamin Williams Leader, and Gaetano Trentanove to the gallery as well.

In purchasing new artworks, Layton utilized his business trips abroad to secure fine works of art. He traveled to New York and visited the estate sales of Mary J. Morgan, George Seney and Alexander Turney Stewart, and then crossed the Atlantic to continue his purchases in Europe.   Layton traveled to and made purchases in Liverpool, Cambridge, London, Paris, Genoa, Milan, Florence, Rome, Venice, Lucerne, and parts of Holland but a great number of his acquisitions abroad came from the fine art dealer Arthur Tooth & Sons on Haymarket Street in London.

As part of their gift to the public, Layton and his wife stipulated in the gallery's deed that the gallery be open at least three days a week without charge for admission and that the facility be available to art students at least two days a week to copy the paintings in the gallery.

Layton made other contributions to Milwaukee's growing art community by lending his own works of art to local exhibitions, as well as providing prize money to other arts organizations that awarded local artists for their entries in special exhibitions. Additionally, Layton helped formally organize the Milwaukee Art Association and was elected its first vice president in 1910. Over the years, the association's name changed to the Milwaukee Art Institute, Milwaukee Art Center and is now known as the Milwaukee Art Museum.

In April 1919, Layton received an award from the National Society of American Scientists as one of the first promoters of art in the United States. In 2004, Layton was posthumously awarded the Wisconsin Visual Art Lifetime Achievement Award.

Other philanthropy 

In 1908, Mr. and Mrs. Layton donated to the Milwaukee Hospital a home for chronic diseases, the Layton Home for Incurables. The Laytons provided the funding for the equipment, furniture, and construction of the building. In years prior, the Laytons had also donated approximately $20,000 (equivalent to $ in ) to the Milwaukee Hospital for landscaping and improvement of the hospital grounds.

In 1901, Layton revisited his birthplace of Little Wilbraham and erected three cottages for elderly villagers who could not afford their own residence. The cottages were built and endowed in memory of his mother, Mary Layton.

Layton was awarded the Liberty Service Medal in May 1919 by the National Institute of Social Service in recognition of the founding of the Layton Art Gallery, Layton Home for Incurables and the Mary Layton Cottages in Little Wilbraham.

Layton also made other smaller donations to local charities on a frequent basis and was therefore given the unofficial titles of "Milwaukee's First Citizen" and Milwaukee's "Grand Old Man" by the local press.

References

External links 
Milwaukee Art Museum
Biographical sketch for Frederick Layton by Wisconsin Historical Society

1827 births
1919 deaths
American art collectors
American philanthropists
Museum founders
British emigrants to the United States
People from South Cambridgeshire District
Businesspeople from Milwaukee
English art collectors
19th-century English businesspeople
19th-century American businesspeople